William Viali (born 16 November 1974) is an Italian football manager and a former player who played as a defender. He is the head coach of  club Cosenza.

Playing career
Viali was signed by Treviso outright in January 2006. Viali finished his career with Cremonese in 2010.

Coaching career
Having been released in 2010 by Cremonese and having decided to retire, Viali became coach of Serie D side Fiorenzuola. After leading the club away from relegation, Viali left the club in 2011. In 2012, Parma announced Viali had become the head coach of their under-16 team.

On 5 December 2017, he was hired as the head coach of Serie C club Cuneo.

On 14 June 2018, he was appointed the new head coach for Novara, which was relegated to Serie C at the end of the previous season.

On 4 June 2019, Novara announced that his contract will not be extended past its expiration on 30 June 2019.

On 28 January 2020, he joined Serie C club Cesena. He left Cesena by the end of the 2021–22 Serie C season.

On 2 November 2022, Viali signed a contract until 30 June 2023 to become the new head coach of Serie B club Cosenza to replace Davide Dionigi, on what was also his first managerial job in the Italian second division.

Honours 
Lupa Piacenza
Eccellenza Emilia–Romagna (1): 2012–13

References

External links
William Viali at Soccerway

1974 births
Living people
People from Vaprio d'Adda
Italian footballers
U.S. Fiorenzuola 1922 S.S. players
Ravenna F.C. players
A.C. Cesena players
Ascoli Calcio 1898 F.C. players
U.S. Lecce players
Venezia F.C. players
A.C. Perugia Calcio players
A.C. Ancona players
ACF Fiorentina players
Treviso F.B.C. 1993 players
A.C. Monza players
U.S. Cremonese players
Serie A players
Serie B players
Serie C players
Association football defenders
Piacenza Calcio 1919 managers
F.C. Südtirol managers
A.C. Cuneo 1905 managers
Novara F.C. managers
Italian football managers
Serie B managers
Serie C managers
Footballers from Lombardy
Sportspeople from the Metropolitan City of Milan
Cosenza Calcio managers